was a  after Kangen and before Kenchō. This period spanned the years from February 1247 to March 1249.

Change of era
 1247 ; 1247: The new era name was created to mark an event or a number of events. The previous era ended and a new one commenced in Kangen 5.

Events of the Hōji era
 1247 (Hōji 1):  The Hōji conflict; Hōjo family destroyed the Miura family; and in so doing, the clan consolidated its authority as regents.

Notes

References
 Nussbaum, Louis-Frédéric and Käthe Roth. (2005).  Japan encyclopedia. Cambridge: Harvard University Press. ;  OCLC 58053128
 Titsingh, Isaac. (1834). Nihon Odai Ichiran; ou,  Annales des empereurs du Japon.  Paris: Royal Asiatic Society, Oriental Translation Fund of Great Britain and Ireland. OCLC 5850691
 Varley, H. Paul. (1980). A Chronicle of Gods and Sovereigns: Jinnō Shōtōki of Kitabatake Chikafusa. New York: Columbia University Press. ;  OCLC 6042764

External links
 National Diet Library, "The Japanese Calendar" -- historical overview plus illustrative images from library's collection

Japanese eras
1240s in Japan